George Albert Proud (9 April 1939 – 23 October 2019) was a member of the House of Commons of Canada from 1988 to 2000.

Proud was born in Charlottetown, Prince Edward Island. From 1974 to 1979, he was a provincial politician in the Legislative Assembly of Prince Edward Island as a Councillor for the 5th Queens provincial electoral district.

Proud moved to federal politics in 1988 general election when he was elected in the Hillsborough electoral district for the Liberal party. He was re-elected in the 1993 and 1997 federal elections. His national Parliament experience spanned the 34th, 35th and 36th Canadian Parliaments.

After leaving federal politics as of the 2000 federal election, Proud became a member of the Canadian Transportation Agency in 2001. He died in 2019 at the age of 80 at a hospital in Charlottetown.

Electoral record

References

External links

1939 births
2019 deaths
People from Charlottetown
Liberal Party of Canada MPs
Members of the House of Commons of Canada from Prince Edward Island
Prince Edward Island Liberal Party MLAs